Hacıqədirli (also, Adzhikadiry, Gadzhi-Kadirli, and Gadzhykadirli) is a village and municipality in the Shamakhi Rayon of Azerbaijan.  It has a population of 514.

References 

Populated places in Shamakhi District